João Maria Lima do Nascimento, also known as Lima (born September 4, 1982 in Brazil) is a Brazilian footballer, who currently plays for Ceará.

References
Sambafoot
Ogol
 

1982 births
Living people
Brazilian footballers
Brazilian expatriate footballers
Campeonato Brasileiro Série B players
Sociedade Esportiva e Recreativa Caxias do Sul players
Goiás Esporte Clube players
Joinville Esporte Clube players
Esporte Clube Bahia players
Paysandu Sport Club players
Ceará Sporting Club players
Brazilian expatriate sportspeople in South Korea
Expatriate footballers in South Korea
K League 1 players
FC Seoul players
Association football forwards
Footballers from Rio de Janeiro (city)